IHF World Women's Outdoor Handball Championship was the world championship of field handball and was organized by the International Handball Federation in the period 1949-1960.

Tournament

1: Germany sent a united team composed of players from the GDR and the FRG.

Medal table

National team appearances in the IHF World Championship

Comprehensive team results by tournament
Source: IHF official site.

Largest margins of victory

References

External links
Official website

 
 

 
IHF World Women's Outdoor Handball Championship
IHF World Women's Outdoor Handball Championship
Women's
World